The SAKO TRG (short for Finnish: "Tarkkuuskivääri Riihimäki G-sarja", "Riihimäki Precision Rifle G-series") is a bolt-action sniper rifle line designed and manufactured by Finnish firearms manufacturer SAKO of Riihimäki. It is the successor to the SAKO TR-6 target rifle, and thus the letter G within the rifle's name is meant to represent number 7 (since G is the seventh letter in alphabetical order).

The TRG-21 and TRG-22 are designed to fire standard .308 Winchester (7.62×51mm NATO) sized cartridges, while the TRG-41 and TRG-42 are designed to fire more powerful and dimensionally larger .300 Winchester Magnum (7.62×67mm) and .338 Lapua Magnum (8.6×70mm) cartridges. They are available with olive drab green, desert tan/coyote brown, dark earth or black stocks, and are also available with a folding stock.

The sniper rifles are normally fitted with muzzle brakes to reduce recoil, jump and flash. The Sako factory TRG muzzle brakes vent sideways and are detachable. Generally TRGs are outfitted with a Zeiss or Schmidt & Bender PM II telescopic sight with fixed power of magnification or with variable magnification. Variable telescopic sights can be used if the operator wants more flexibility to shoot at varying ranges, or when a wide field of view is required.

In October 2011, Sako introduced the Sako TRG M10 Sniper Weapon System. It was designed as a user configurable multi calibre modular system responding to evolving market demands and does not share its receiver and other technical features with the rest of the TRG line.

History

Even though the TRG-21 obtained its origins from the successful Sako TR-6 target rifle and 1984-1986 development work for the hardly produced Valmet Sniper M86 rifle by the former Finnish state firearms company Valmet which merged with Sako, the 4.7 kg (10 lb 6 oz) TRG-21 was designed as a result of a thorough study of sniper requirements.

In 1989 Sako Ltd. (Riihimäki, Finland) introduced the TRG-21 precision rifle as a sniper rifle model chambered in .308 Winchester. The evolution of this design continues to the present and can be found in Sako's hunting rifle offerings, the Sako 75 and the Sako 85. Subsequently, a second precision/sniper rifle with a  longer scaled up magnum action emerged as the TRG-41 in order to take advantage of the .338 Lapua Magnum cartridge.

A more hunting oriented variation of the TRG was introduced in 1992 as the TRG-S M995 and TRG-S M995 Magnum, which both use the same scaled up magnum action and bolt (different bolt handle) as the TRG-41 with the exception that the receiver is open at the top with an integral Sako-type wedged dovetail rail rather than possessing a cartridge ejection port on the right side and a parallel   integral dovetail rail as found with the TRG-41. The TRG-S M995 (Magnum) was produced until 2003 and chambered in eight standard chamberings and fourteen magnum chamberings, including .338 Lapua Magnum. Four different sized detachable box magazines and three different bolt bodies were used to accommodate the dimensionally different rifle cartridges offered. However, M995 carbines imported to the United States featured a  barrel and were chambered in .375 H&H Magnum only. In the end Sako abandoned this plan and only a handful of M975 prototypes were produced.

To make the TRG system more suitable for military use, Sako upgraded and improved the TRG-21/41 design in the late 1990s. Some TRG accessories like the muzzle brake and bipod (that lets the rifle swivel or "hang" near its bore axis offering a more stable shooting position with large and heavy aiming optics mounted) were also improved. This resulted in the TRG-22/42 rifle system introduced in 1999.

In June 2007 a voluntary factory recall concerning TRG-22, TRG-42 and M995 (TRG-S) rifles manufactured between October 1999 and October 2002 was put out to correct the possibility that a portion of the firing pin could exit rearwards when firing a defective cartridge.

Around 2011 an American Sako vendor commissioned a special limited production run of TRG-22 sniper rifles chambered in .260 Remington cartridge and started offering them as of May 2011.

In 2013 the TRG system was further upgraded and improved  based on customer requirements. The upgrades consist of mounting improved recoil pads to reduce felt recoil, a newly constructed  bolt release and a new fully adjustable two-stage trigger mechanism that features a new more ergonomic ambidextrous safety lever, and a trigger guard milled from aluminium for more positive magazine attachment. Further the bolt handle and its attachment to the bolt body were ruggedised. These general 2013 upgrades are backwards compatible with older TRG sniper rifles. Exclusive for the .338 Lapua Magnum chambered TRG-42 model a new bolt featuring double plunger ejectors was introduced in 2013 to improve the ejection reliability of dimensionally large and heavy .338 Lapua Magnum rifle cases.

In 2018 Sako introduced the TRG-22 A1 and TRG-42 A1 models. The TRG A1 models have a Sako TRG M10 Sniper Weapon System alike stock, featuring an aluminium middle chassis frame, side-folding buttstock, and a fore-end with the M-LOK rail interface system that allows for direct accessory attachment onto "negative space" (hollow slot) mounting points. The TRG A1 models do not offer the user configurable multi calibre modular system of the Sako TRG M10 Sniper Weapon System. The bolts of the TRG A1 models all feature double plunger ejectors introduced earlier for the .338 Lapua Magnum TRG-42 and the TRG-22 A1 model expands the chambering palette with 6.5mm Creedmoor.

Sako never totally forgot the target rifle origins of the TRG system. The necessary accessories to attach sighting components such as match grade peep sights or target aperture sights and a mirage strap are all available. Equipped with these accessories the TRG can be used for non military or law enforcement tasks such as 300 m UIT standard rifle competition, CISM competition or other kinds of full bore target shooting. The rifle is commonly seen in long-range competition where it has done very well. Besides civilian target shooting the TRG system can and is sometimes used for hunting.

The TRG system's purposive design features, reliability in adverse conditions and consistent accuracy performance (a capable marksman can expect ≤ 0.5 MOA consistent accuracy with appropriate ammunition) have made it a popular, though expensive, sniper rifle system.

Design details

The TRG system is almost unique in being a purpose-designed sniper rifle, rather than an accurised version of an existing, general-purpose rifle. The sniper rifles can have a matte or manganese phosphatised finish.

Features
The heart of the TRG system is a cold-hammer forged receiver and barrel. Both provide maximum strength for minimum weight as well as excellent resistance to wear. The action has a hex style profile on top with a smaller closed ejection port. Actions with an ejection port make it more difficult to reach in with a finger to discreetly eject brass when desired, but it does allow for additional strength in the action. The "resistance free" bolt has three massive lugs and requires a 60-degree bolt rotation and a  bolt throw for the short and  bolt throw for the long bolt-action; these features should be appreciated by the shooter during multiple firings that require rapid projectile placement on the target. The bolt handle is the appropriate length and sports a large synthetic bulbous knob that provides a firm, positive grip. On top of the receiver a  integral dovetail rail with shape connection drillings for one or more recoil lugs provides for fixing mounting components to accommodate different types of optical or electro-optical sights. Folding iron sights can be obtained for secondary or emergency use.

The receiver's large bedding surface is mated to an aluminium alloy-bedding block by three screws for maximum stability. This combination ensures an unusually high degree of stability.

Ammunition feeding
The detachable box magazine is based upon centre feeding for maximum reliability as well as precise positioning of the cartridge into the chamber. Alternatively cartridges can be loaded singly directly into the chamber.

Barrel
The free-floating, heavy, chrome moly barrels (chrome moly barrels resist throat erosion better offering a longer accuracy life than stainless steel barrels) for the available cartridge chamberings all have a different length, groove cutting and rifling twist rate optimised for their respective chambering and intended ammunition. On special order TRG sniper rifles can also be supplied with stainless steel barrels. Two types of flash eliminator/muzzle brakes are available as an accessory with one being threaded to accommodate a sound-suppressor.

For the .260 Remington chambering a non-traditional 203 mm (1 in 8 inch) or 31.2 calibres right-hand twist rate optimised to stabilise longer, heavier very-low-drag bullets was selected over the standard 229 mm (1 in 9 inch) or 35.2 calibres twist rate. The TRG-22 can be ordered cambered for the .260 Remington cartridge as of May 2011. The introduction of the .260 Remington (6.5×51mm) chambering does not introduce major technical changes for the TRG system since the .260 Remington is essentially a necked down 6.5 mm (.264 in) variant of the .308 Winchester (7.62×51mm) cartridge, meaning these cartridges can be used in .308 Winchester chambered rifles only requiring different barrels.

The 6.5 Creedmoor chambering has the traditional 203 mm (1 in 8 inch) or 31.2 calibres right-hand twist rate shares the relative ease of chambering it in arms designed for .308 Winchester sized cartridges, though the 6.5 Creedmoor (6.5×49mm) maximal overall length is  longer compared to the .308 Winchester.

For the .308 Winchester chambering the 280 mm (1 in 11 inch) or 36.7 calibres right-hand twist rate with four grooves was selected over the 305 mm (1 in 12 inch) or 40 calibres, traditionally found for the .308 Winchester, as a compromise when switching between supersonic and subsonic cartridges.

The .300 Winchester Magnum chambering also has a non-traditional 280 mm (1 in 11 inch) or 36.7 calibres right-hand twist rate. Due to the .300 Winchester Magnum cartridge dimensions it is a long TRG-41/TRG-42 bolt-action chambering.

For the .338 Lapua Magnum chambering a non-traditional 305 mm (1 in 12 inch) or 36.4 calibres right-hand twist rate was selected to optimise the rifle for firing 16.2 gram (250 grain) .338-calibre very-low-drag bullets. As of 2009 .338 Lapua Magnum barrels can also be supplied with a 254 mm (1 in 10 inch) or 30.3 calibres twist rate optimised to stabilise longer, heavier very-low-drag bullets like the Sierra HPBT MatchKing and Lapua Scenar .338-calibre 19.44 gram (300 grain) bullets. The traditional 254 mm (1 in 10 inch) has since become the standard twist rate for the .338 Lapua Magnum chambering. Due to the .338 Lapua Magnum cartridge dimensions it is a long TRG-41/TRG-42 bolt-action chambering.

Trigger
The two-stage trigger mechanism displays an adjustable trigger pull weight of 1 to 2.5 kg (2 to 5 lb) and can be adjusted for length, horizontal and vertical pitch. The advantage of these features is to prevent trigger movement in an inappropriate direction that would cause the rifle to move off target. Trigger travel is short with no noticeable over-travel. The trigger mechanism can be removed without additional disassembling of the rifle. The trigger guard is dimensioned to allow easy access with gloved fingers.

Safety
The safety lever is located in front of the trigger inside of the trigger guard and can be operated without producing mechanical noise. The two-position safety locks the trigger mechanism, locks the bolt in closed position and blocks the firing pin. The safety is on when it is in its rearmost position. It is off when it is pushed to its most forward position. When the weapon is cocked the firing pin protrudes  from the rear of the bolt-action, making it possible to feel if the weapon is ready to fire or not in poor visibility.

Stock

The TRG stock design is besides sniping requirements, designed to conform to both UIT and CISM regulations. Sako offers black, green, desert tan or dark earth coloured stock variants and the green, desert tan or dark earth stock variants are  heavier than the black variants. In 2011 Sako also began offering stocks in several styles of digital camouflage. The base of the ergonomic injection-moulded polyurethane forestock is made of aluminium and encompasses the bedding block with the bedding block serving as a point of attachment for a bipod. The polyurethane buttstock with its pistol grip and integrated aluminium skeleton to add strength, is designed for right- and left-handed shooters. The rear of the buttstock possesses a series of spacer and angle plates to regulate the length of pull and curvature adjustments that can be tailored for the individual shooter. The buttplate is adjustable for both height and pitch. Finally, the cheek-piece is adjustable for both height and pitch as well.

The stock features two steel sling swivel attachment sockets positioned at the right and left rear sides of the buttstock. Forward sling attachment is achieved by inserting and fixing a metal sling mount into a metal rail which runs under the forestock or forend. This forward sling attachment point can be (re)positioned along the length of the rail for right- or left-handed use and is fixed with a screw. The factory carrying/shooting sling itself features quick mountable and detachable metal swivels. The swivels are mounted by pushing them into an attachment socket and detached by pushing integrated buttons in the swivels and pulling them out of the attachment sockets.

A folding skeleton type buttstock designed for right- and left-handed shooters is also available. The folding stock is  heavier than the non-folding green, desert tan or dark earth stock variants and is hinged behind the pistol grip; it folds to the left side and locks into position. When folded, the rifle becomes  shorter. The steel parts of the folding stock are manganese phosphatised and the polyurethane parts are coloured olive drab or desert tan. The rear of the buttstock is adjustable for length of pull and height. The cheek-piece and rear support are also adjustable for height. These adjustment options allow shooters of various sizes and shapes to tailor the TRG folding stock to their personal preferences, which is an uncommon feature for folding stocks. The pistol grip body has a steel loop for a hook type military sling swivel. Sako TRG folding stock rifles are supplied with a Picatinny rail for mounting aiming optics.

The folding stock was later redesigned with the most conspicuous change being a bigger "foot" with an external lever/hinge support system monopod instead of the vertical moving small "spike" found on the earlier folding stock.

Accessories
Sako accessories for the TRG system includes an auxiliary iron sights for emergency use, a muzzle brake/flash-hider, a match sight mounting set, a telescopic sight mounting sets, a STANAG 2324 (Picatinny rail), an accessory ITRS tri-rail (top) and accessory rail (bottom) TRG forestock, a night sight adapter, a sound suppressor, a muzzle thread protector, various slings and swivels, cleaning kits, soft case, and a heavy-duty transit case. Several versions of TRG-specific bipods were produced that all lock into an attachment point in the aluminium bedding block at the end of the forestock. The latest bipod version is one of a few rifle bipods that lets the rifle swivel or "hang" just above its bore axis offering a more stable shooting position with large and heavy aiming optics mounted. It has a narrower leg angle due to complaints that the previous version interfered with some night vision systems mounted forward of the telescopic sight. Further versions of accessories are the ITRS tri-rail NV attachment point with an optional extended aluminium bedding block. This extended bedding block also can feature an optional STANAG 2324 Picatinny rail in the bottom of the block.

Variants
The Sako TRG-21 (1989) is designed to chamber the .308 Winchester (7.62×51mm NATO) cartridge.
An American Sako vendor also commissioned a special limited production run of the TRG-22 chambered in .260 Remington cartridge.
The Sako TRG-41 (1989) is designed to chamber either the .338 Lapua Magnum or .300 Winchester Magnum cartridge.
The Sako TRG-S M995 (1992) is a hunting orientated variant of the TRG-41 designed to chamber eight standard an fourteen magnum chamberings and was produced until 2003.
The Beretta TRG-42 was presented by Sako (importer Beretta USA) at the Association of the United States Army (AUSA) Annual Meeting and Exposition in October 2008, as a possible platform for fulfilling the United States Military .338 calibre Precision Sniper Rifle (PSR) solicitations. It is essentially a TRG-42 with a shorter barrel, a folding stock and an integrated extended rail system.
The Sako TRG-22 A1 (2018) is an upgraded and improved variant of the TRG-22 with a new stock design.
The Sako TRG-42 A1 (2018) is an upgraded and improved variant of the TRG-42 with a new stock design.

TRG M10 design evolution 

The Sako TRG M10 Sniper Weapon System was unveiled by Sako in October 2011. It was designed as a user configurable multi calibre modular system and does not share its receiver and other technical features with the Sako TRG line. It can switch between .308 Winchester (7.62×51mm NATO), .300 Winchester Magnum and .338 Lapua Magnum chamberings by changing the bolts, magazines, forends and barrels, to adapt to various requirements in the field. When it was first introduced, it was marketed for "military and law enforcement only".

It was entered as a contender for the Precision Sniper Rifle program by the United States Special Operations Command to replace all current bolt-action sniper rifles in use by U.S. special operations snipers with a single bolt-action rifle chambered for a large calibre magnum chambering. The contract was awarded to Remington Arms for their Modular Sniper Rifle winning against the TRG M10 in 2013.

The TRG M10 is a manually operated bolt action sniper rifle that uses a rotary bolt with three radial locking lugs at the front. It features a steel receiver, a Picatinny rail on top of its receiver for mounting various optical sights and on the stock bottom for bipod mounting. The barrel is a free floating barrel that can be equipped with special muzzle brakes that have a mounting interface for quick detachable suppressors. It is offered in various barrel lengths of 16-, 20- and 26-inch for the .308 Winchester (7.62×51mm NATO), 23.5- and 27-inch for the .300 Winchester Magnum, and 20- and 27-inch for the .338 Lapua Magnum. Ammunition feeding is by a double-stack detachable box magazine which is marked with appropriate number of large dots that are embossed into the sides of the polymer baseplate and that holds 11 rounds of .308 Winchester (7.62×51mm NATO), 7 rounds of .300 Winchester Magnum, or 8 rounds of .338 Lapua Magnum. Alternatively, cartridges can be singly loaded directly into the chamber.

The TRG M10 has a side-folding and fully adjustable buttstock, featuring an aluminium middle chassis frame, side-folding buttstock, and a fore-end with the M-LOK rail interface system that allows for direct accessory attachment onto "negative space" (hollow slot) mounting points, ambidextrous controls, a manual safety that is located inside the trigger guard which is in front of the trigger, and uniquely designed tactical indicators which helps identify different modular components for different calibres, where every calibre-depending component is specially marked so users can recognise the calibre of each part visually or by touch. For example, for the .308 Winchester barrel and bolt are marked with single annual grove, whereas for the .300 Winchester Magnum are marked with two groves and three for the .338 Lapua Magnum. Another unique feature of the rifle is that all of the tools that are necessary to change the calibre are built into each of the bolt handle; the small torx key is built into the centre of the bolt knob and the barrel wrench is integrated into the base of the bolt handle. An additional set of Torx keys are stored inside a small detachable polymer forend, which are necessary for full disassembly of the gun.

Sako states that the TRG M10 factory acceptance tests with high quality match ammunition has an accuracy of 1 MOA (0.291 mil) for .338 Lapua Magnum and .300 Winchester Magnum chambered models and ⅔ MOA (0.194 mil) for .308 Winchester chambered models.

A 2019 TRG M10 spare parts catalologue offered accessories in black or coyote brown coloured surface finishes and accessories for using the 6.5mm Creedmoor and .300 Norma Magnum chamberings.

Users

See also
 Accuracy International Arctic Warfare
 Accuracy International AWM
 PGM Ultima Ratio
 PGM 338
 Bolt-action rifles
 List of firearms
 Rifles
 Sniper
 Sniper rifle

References

External links and sources

 Official Sako TRG website (11. Jan. 2016)
 demigodllc.com: Military .338 Lapua Rifles Compared, the SAKO TRG-42 and AI-AWSM by Zak Smith
 demigodllc.com: Military .338 Shootout: Sako TRG-42 vs. Accuracy International AWSM by Zak Smith (image collection)
 uvson308.com TRG-42 black & green by Julien Cartier (image collection)
 uvson308.com TRG-42 vs. PGM .338 LM by Julien Cartier (image collection)
 Guns Magazine, April, 2002: Sako's sniper: The TRG-22 precision rifle by David M. Fortier
 accurateshooter.com: Gun of the Week Collection, Week 69, A Tale of Two TRGs by Terje Fjørtoft
 Finland's Silenced .338 Long-Range Sniper: Sako TRG42 Rifle and BR-Tuote T8M Reflex Suppressor by Al Paulson
 Sako TRG-42 review:  Guns & Ammo, April 2010

7.62×51mm NATO rifles
.338 Lapua Magnum rifles
.338 firearms
.300 Winchester Magnum firearms
Bolt-action rifles of Finland
Sniper rifles of Finland
Military equipment introduced in the 2000s